"Houseparty" is a song by Italian singer Annalisa. It was written by Annalisa, Davide Simonetta and Jacopo Ettorre, and produced by Michele Canova and Patrizio Simonini.

It was released by Warner Music Italy on 15 April 2020 as the second single from her seventh studio album Nuda. The song peaked at number 73 on the FIMI Singles Chart.

Music video
The animated music video of "Houseparty" was directed by Davide Bastolla and released onto YouTube on 21 April 2020.

Track listing

Charts

Certifications

References

2020 singles
2020 songs
Annalisa songs
Songs written by Davide Simonetta
Songs written by Annalisa